The Norfolk pigeon or Norfolk Island pigeon (Hemiphaga novaeseelandiae spadicea), sometimes called the wood quest, was a subspecies of the New Zealand pigeon (kererū) that inhabited Norfolk Island. This population probably colonized Norfolk Island from New Zealand during the Pleistocene. It became extinct around the turn of the 20th century.

Taxonomy 
German naturalist Johann Reinhold Forster described the Norfolk pigeon as Columba argetraea in 1794, however the name was not used. English ornithologist John Latham described it as Columba spadicea in his 1801 work Supplementum Indicis Ornithologici.  

Twenty specimens of the Norfolk Pigeon are known.  Three of these are in the Natural History Museum, Leiden, two in the Natural History Museum New York and one specimen in World Museum Liverpool. DNA collected and analyzed from toepad tissue indicated that the Norfolk Island pigeon is genetically sister to the New Zealand Hemiphaga novaeseelandiae population.

Early records from Norfolk Island indicate the local people gave it the name "wood quest", however the name was not passed on from the second settlement to the Pitcairn settlers. The term is related to the words "queece", "queest" and "quist" used for the wood pigeon in the West Midlands and southwestern England.

Ecology 

 
The abundance of the Norfolk pigeon at the time of the island's settlement is unknown.  Early records indicate the presence of the bird, but do not contain any information on its numbers.  Based on the behaviour of the other subspecies, it is likely that the bird relied upon fruiting plants for food.

Extinction 
The extinction of the Norfolk pigeon was caused by a combination of the introduction of cats and weasels, habitat destruction by human settlers, and direct hunting by humans.  Before European settlement, the bird had been hunted by Polynesian settlers of the island.  When Europeans reached the island, however, the birds remained and the Polynesians did not. The Europeans took up the bird as a food source. An officer of the penal colony there, Ensign Abel Dottin William Best, recorded the species as still quite common in 1838, with his journals mentioning his successful hunting of 72 birds, including 25 on September 18, 1838. The last sighting occurred in 1901. Direct hunting by humans was probably the dominant cause of extinction.

Memorials 
The Government of Norfolk Island released a stamp commemorating the bird on February 24, 1971.

References

External links 
A painting of a Norfolk Island Pigeon by Paul Martinson at the Museum of New Zealand Te Papa Tongarewa

Extinct birds of Norfolk Island
Treroninae
Birds described in 1801